Club Fonograma was a United States-based daily Internet publication established in 2008 that was devoted to music criticism and commentary, music news, mixtapes, podcasts, and artist interviews. Its focus is on global pop and independent music from artists of Spanish, Caribbean, and Latin American origin or background. It was notable for its eclectic and idiosyncratic English-language coverage of mostly Spanish-language music. It was praised as the "Pitchfork of Latin Music" and as "hands down the best go-to music site for indie music out of America and Spain."

Club Fonograma was created in Phoenix, Arizona in 2008 by Chicano cinephile Carlos Reyes, while attending college in Phoenix. During its run, the site has expanded from a simple music review site and now also covers events such as South by Southwest, the Latin American Music Conference, Vive Latino, and Festival NRMAL. Their coverage has also been praised by American music outlets such as Pitchfork and NPR. The site also won a 2012 IMAS award for "Best Music Website."

From 2008 through 2011, the site curated a mixtape series called Fonogramaticos. These albums contained a mix of unreleased songs from both prominent major-label acts and unsigned or independent artists, and are free for readers to download. A total of fourteen volumes were created in the series. Since then, the site has released annual compilations outside the Fonogramaticos series.

In 2011, the site began its own podcast called the Fonocast, hosted by writer Blanca Mendez. Each month, the Fonocast is centered on a different theme, and has a revolving set of co-hosts, usually other Club Fonograma staff writers.

On December 28, 2022, it was announced that the owner of the site, Carlos Reyes, had died. Helado Negro, Julieta Venegas, Quiero Club, and many others expressed both sadness at his passing and gratitude for the power of his work.

Club Fonograma Album and Song of the Year winners

Club Fonograma Album of the Year

Club Fonograma Song of the Year

Club Fonograma Top 10 Albums of the Decade (2000-2009)

Club Fonograma Top 10 Songs of the Decade (2000-2009)

References

External links

2008 establishments in Arizona
Internet properties established in 2008
Music blogs
Music review websites
American music websites